Marilyn Webb may refer to:
 Marilyn Salzman Webb (born 1942), American activist, author, journalist, and professor
 Marilyn Webb, co-founder of Bethel Heights Vineyard

See also
 Marilynn Webb (1937–2021), New Zealand artist